Agate was the codename of the first French nuclear underground test. It was conducted by the Joint Special Weapons Command on 7 November 1961, at the Oasis Military Experiments Centre near In Ekker, French Algeria at the Tan Afella in the Hoggar Mountains, during the Algerian War.

It is named after the Agate, a rock formation used in jewelry.

History 

Agate was the first test of the jewel designation series running from 1961 until 1966. Minor and major incidents occurred during these experiments, the most important being the Béryl incident on May 1, 1962, where the nine militarymen of the 621ème Groupe d'Armes Spéciales unit were heavily contaminated (600 mSv) as portrayed in the 2006 docudrama Vive La Bombe!. The French Defence Minister Pierre Messmer and other officials and civilians were present in the command post and were contaminated too (around >200 mSv).

Programme 
1961-11-07: Agate (Agate): 10 kt
1962-05-01: Béryl (Beryl): 40 kt
1963-03-18: Émeraude (Emerald): 10 kt
1963-03-30: Améthyste (Amethyst): 2.5 kt
1963-10-20: Rubis (Ruby): 52 kt
1964-02-14: Opale (Opal): 3.7 kt
1964-06-15: Topaze (Topaz): 2.5 kt
1964-11-28: Turquoise (Turquoise): 10 kt
1965-02-27: Saphir (Sapphire): 127 kt
1965-05-30: Jade (Jade): 2.5 kt
1965-10-01: Corindon (Corundum): 2.5 kt
1965-12-01: Tourmaline (Tourmaline): 10 kt
1966-02-16: Grenat (Garnet): 13 kt

Known incidents 
The millisievert (mSv) is commonly used to measure the effective dose in diagnostic medical procedures. See radiation poisoning for a more complete analysis of effects of various dosage levels.

1962-05-01: Béryl casualties
100 pers. (>50 mSv)
15 pers. (>200 mSv)
9 pers. (600 mSv)
possibly 240 pers. (<2.5 mSv)
1963-03-30: Améthyste casualties
13 pers. (=10 mSv)
280 pers. (<1 mSv)
1963-10-20: Rubis casualties
500 pers. (<0.2 mSv)
undisclosed (= 0.01 mSv)
1965-05-30 Jade casualties:
undisclosed (<1 mSv)

Data provided by the French Defense Ministry in January 2007.

See also 
 Gerboise Bleue (French first atmospheric A-bomb)
 Canopus (French first atmospheric H-bomb)
 Force de Frappe
 List of states with nuclear weapons
 Nuclear weapons and France
 History of nuclear weapons

Notes

References 

French nuclear weapons testing
1961 in France
1961 in Algeria